The Gethsemane Cemetery is located in Little Ferry, Bergen County, New Jersey, United States on an acre on a sandy hill just off U.S. Route 46 and Liberty Street. The cemetery was added to the National Register of Historic Places on April 20, 1994.

Name
Gethsemane (Greek ΓεΘσημανἰ, Gethsēmani Hebrew:גת שמנים, Aramaic:גת שמני, Gath-Šmânê, Assyrian ܓܕܣܡܢ, Gat Šmānê, lit. "oil press") is a garden at the foot of the Mount of Olives in Jerusalem, most famous as the place where Jesus and his disciples prayed the night before Jesus' crucifixion.

History
The cemetery was opened in 1860 as a burial ground for nearby African-American residents. In 1901 the cemetery was turned over to seven African-American trustees and incorporated as Gethsemane Cemetery. Over 500 people were buried in less than an acre of land. The last burial occurred in 1924. Bergen County took over the maintain of the cemetery in 1985 and dedicated it as a County Historic Site. Fewer than 50 gravestones remain intact.

Notable burials
 Elizabeth Sutliff Dulfer, (d. 1880) – formerly enslaved, owned second largest clay company at the time.
 Peter Billings – Civil War veteran
 Silas M. Carpenter – Civil War veteran

See also
 National Register of Historic Places listings in Bergen County, New Jersey
 Bergen County Cemeteries

References

External links
 
 Google Street View of Gethsemane Cemetery
 

Little Ferry, New Jersey
Cemeteries in Bergen County, New Jersey
African-American cemeteries
African-American history of New Jersey
Cemeteries on the National Register of Historic Places in New Jersey
National Register of Historic Places in Bergen County, New Jersey
1860 establishments in New Jersey
New Jersey Register of Historic Places